Kitchener City Hall is a stop on the Region of Waterloo's Ion rapid transit system. It is located alongside Duke Street, just east of Young Street, in downtown Kitchener. Just west of the station is its namesake, Kitchener City Hall. It opened in 2019.

The station's feature wall consists of glass tiles in a pattern of alternating horizontal stripes in two shades of green and in white; this mimics the coloration of the office tower of the namesake City Hall.

The platform is connected with Duke Street's sidewalks at either end, and pedestrians passing through walk along the platform.

Locations in the vicinity of the station include Kitchener's main Catholic precinct to the north (including St. Mary's Church and the headquarters of the Waterloo Catholic District School Board); its former St. Jerome's College building to the west now houses Wilfrid Laurier University's Faculty of Social Work. Immediately south of the station is the 'City Centre' condominium development.

References

External links

 

Ion light rail stations
City Hall station
2019 establishments in Ontario